Tyrinthia colombiana is a species of beetle in the family Cerambycidae. It was described by Galileo and Martins in 2009. It is known from Colombia.

References

Hemilophini
Beetles described in 2009